The following television stations operate on virtual channel 6 in the United States:

 K03ET-D in Terrace Lakes, Idaho
 K03IN-D in Leavenworth, Washington
 K04RT-D in Judith Gap, Montana
 K06NT-D in Dolores, Colorado
 K06PU-D in Yakima, Washington
 K06QA-D in Odessa, Texas
 K06QD-D in Pasco, Washington
 K06QI-D in Alamogordo, New Mexico
 K06QJ-D in Sioux Falls, South Dakota
 K06QW-D in Sentinel, Arizona
 K06QX-D in Reno, Nevada
 K07WJ-D in Colstrip, Montana
 K07WP-D in Roundup, Montana
 K07YV-D in The Dalles, Oregon
 K07ZQ-D in Georgetown, Idaho
 K07ZR-DT in Harlowton & Shawmut, Montana
 K08ET-D in Durango, Colorado
 K08ND-D in Akron, Colorado
 K09BI-D in Methow, Washington
 K09KH-D in Watkins, etc., Montana
 K09LW-D in Martinsdale/Lennep, Montana
 K09MY-D in Polaris, Montana
 K10AP-D in Pateros/Mansfield, Washington
 K10HL-D in Virginia City, Montana
 K10PV-D in Santa Barbara, California
 K11DL-D in Juliaetta, Idaho
 K11LA-D in Basin, Montana
 K11MP-D in White Sulphur Spring, Montana
 K11PP-D in Dingle, etc., Idaho
 K12LF-D in Coolin, Idaho
 K12LI-D in Thayne, etc., Wyoming
 K12LV-D in Dryden, Washington
 K12RD-D in Coulee City, Washington
 K13KP-D in Boulder, Montana
 K13KV-D in Troy, Montana
 K13UF-D in Rexburg, Idaho
 K13XW-D in Akron, Colorado
 K13XX-D in Hesperus, Colorado
 K15IB-D in Malad, Idaho
 K15JA-D in Harlowton, etc., Montana
 K15KV-D in Rockaway Beach, Oregon
 K16DH-D in Miles City, Montana
 K16DZ-D in Hardin, Montana
 K16JZ-D in McDermitt, Nevada
 K16MT-D in Leamington, Utah
 K16NJ-D in Anton, Colorado
 K17KX-D in Anton, Colorado
 K18DT-D in Coeur d'Alene, Idaho
 K18ET-D in Orderville, Utah
 K19EG-D in Holyoke, Colorado
 K19KY-D in Pocatello, Idaho
 K20GG-D in Duncan, Arizona
 K20HM-D in Idalia, Colorado
 K21LD-D in Mazama, Washington
 K22JF-D in Stemilt, etc., Washington
 K22JJ-D in Milton-Freewater, Oregon
 K23JK-D in Tillamook, Oregon
 K23LW-D in Emigrant, Montana
 K23NL-D in Cottonwood/Grangeville, Idaho
 K23OR-D in Pagosa Springs, Colorado
 K23OV-D in Hood River, Oregon
 K24HQ-D in Boulder, Colorado
 K24KG-D in Madras, Oregon
 K24KM-D in Colstrip, etc., Montana
 K24MC-D in Baker Valley, Oregon
 K25BP-D in Billings, Montana
 K25OA-D in Dillon, Montana
 K26FM-D in Peetz, Colorado
 K26GX-D in Pleasant Valley, Colorado
 K26OP-D in Holbrook, Idaho
 K27DX-D in McCall, Idaho
 K27MW-D in Soda Springs, Idaho
 K28IT-D in Kanab, Utah
 K29BM-D in Montpelier, Idaho
 K29EL-D in La Grande, Oregon
 K29FR-D in Quanah, Texas
 K29HR-D in Farmington, New Mexico
 K29IB-D in Grays River, etc., Washington
 K30OG-D in La Grande, Oregon
 K31CR-D in Prineville, etc., Oregon
 K31CT-D in Cortez, Colorado
 K31FV-D in Durango & Hermosa, Colorado
 K31LE-D in Bridger, etc., Montana
 K32DE-D in Pendleton, Oregon
 K32KO-D in Garden Valley, Idaho
 K32LS-D in Driggs, Idaho
 K32MN-D in Howard, Montana
 K32NU-D in Haxtun, Colorado
 K33EA-D in Columbus, Montana
 K34DC-D in Astoria, Oregon
 K34JR-D in Madras, Oregon
 K34QD-D in Bayfield & Ignacio, Colorado
 K35BW-D in Lewiston, Idaho
 K38CZ-D in Lincoln City/Newport, Oregon
 K47LM-D in Prineville, etc., Oregon
 K48DX-D in Sandpoint, Idaho
 K50GL-D in Bonners Ferry, Idaho
 KAAL in Austin, Minnesota
 KAUZ-TV in Wichita Falls, Texas
 KBFW-LD in Arlington, Texas
 KBJR-TV in Superior, Wisconsin
 KBKF-LD in San Jose, California
 KBSD-DT in Ensign, Kansas
 KCEN-TV in Temple, Texas
 KCVH-LD in Houston, Texas
 KDBZ-CD in Bozeman, Montana
 KEMV in Mountain View, Arkansas
 KFDM in Beaumont, Texas
 KFLZ-LD in San Antonio, Texas
 KFMY-LD in Petaluma, California
 KFVE in Kailua-Kona, Hawaii
 KHQ-TV in Spokane, Washington
 KIDY in San Angelo, Texas
 KIPS-LD in Beaumont, Texas
 KIVI-TV in Nampa, Idaho
 KMOH-TV in Kingman, Arizona
 KMOS-TV in Sedalia, Missouri
 KOIN in Portland, Oregon
 KOTV-DT in Tulsa, Oklahoma
 KPLO-TV in Reliance, South Dakota
 KPTW in Casper, Wyoming
 KPVI-DT in Pocatello, Idaho
 KREZ-TV in Durango, Colorado
 KRIS-TV in Corpus Christi, Texas
 KRMA-TV in Denver, Colorado
 KRVD-LD in Banning, California
 KSAW-LD in Twin Falls, Idaho
 KSBY in San Luis Obispo, California
 KSFV-CD in Los Angeles, California
 KSNL-LD in Salina, Kansas
 KSRE in Minot, North Dakota
 KSVI in Billings, Montana
 KTAL-TV in Texarkana, Texas
 KTVM-TV in Butte, Montana
 KTVW-CD in Flagstaff/Doney Park, Arizona
 KUAT-TV in Tucson, Arizona
 KVIE in Sacramento, California
 KWFT-LD in Fort Smith, Arkansas
 KWNB-LD in McCook, Nebraska
 KWNB-TV in Hayes Center, Nebraska
 KWQC-TV in Davenport, Iowa
 KYMU-LD in Seattle, Washington
 KZFW-LD in Dallas, Texas
 KZNO-LD in Big Bear Lake, California
 W06DA-D in Aguada, Puerto Rico
 W06DI-D in Jasper, Florida
 W14EM-D in Marquette, Michigan
 W26EQ-D in State College, Pennsylvania
 W26FA-D in Marion, North Carolina
 W29DH-D in Moorefield, West Virginia
 WABG-TV in Greenwood, Mississippi
 WATE-TV in Knoxville, Tennessee
 WBRC in Birmingham, Alabama
 WCML in Alpena, Michigan
 WCSH in Portland, Maine
 WCTV in Thomasville, Georgia
 WDAY-TV in Fargo, North Dakota
 WDCN-LD in Fairfax, Virginia
 WDHC-LD in Lebanon, Kentucky
 WDSU in New Orleans, Louisiana
 WECT in Wilmington, North Carolina
 WFIB-LD in Key West, Florida
 WGCE-CD in Rochester, New York
 WHDT-LD in Boston, Massachusetts
 WILC-CD in Sugar Grove, Illinois
 WIPR-TV in San Juan, Puerto Rico
 WITI in Milwaukee, Wisconsin
 WJAC-TV in Johnstown, Pennsylvania
 WJBF in Augusta, Georgia
 WJMF-LD in Jackson, Mississippi
 WKMG-LD in Ocala, Florida
 WKMG-TV in Orlando, Florida
 WLNE-TV in New Bedford, Massachusetts
 WLNS-TV in Lansing, Michigan
 WLUC-TV in Marquette, Michigan
 WOOT-LD in Chattanooga, Tennessee
 WOWT in Omaha, Nebraska
 WPSD-TV in Paducah, Kentucky
 WPVI-TV in Philadelphia, Pennsylvania
 WRGB in Schenectady, New York
 WRTN-LD in Alexandria, Tennessee
 WRTV in Indianapolis, Indiana
 WSYX in Columbus, Ohio
 WTBS-LD in Atlanta, Georgia
 WTCL-LD in Cleveland, Ohio
 WTVJ in Miami, Florida
 WTVR-TV in Richmond, Virginia
 WVOA-LD in Westvale, New York
 WVVA in Bluefield, West Virginia

The following stations, which are no longer licensed, formerly operated on virtual channel 6:
 K06LG-D in Chuathbaluk, Alaska
 K06NG-D in Sargents, Colorado
 K16HQ-D in Georgetown, Idaho
 K21NL-D in Howard, Montana
 K26NR-D in Rainier, Oregon
 K34IF-D in Wallowa, Oregon

References

06 virtual